The 3rd constituency of the Landes (French: Troisième circonscription des Landes) is a French legislative constituency in the Landes département. Like the other 576 French constituencies, it elects one MP using the two-round system, with a run-off if no candidate receives over 50% of the vote in the first round.

Description

The 3rd constituency of the Landes lies in the south east of the department. The seat does not contain a major urban centre. Since 1978 the voters of this constituency have consistently returned Socialist Party deputies most notably former Government Minister, President of the National Assembly and First Secretary of the Socialist Party Henri Emmanuelli.

Assembly Members

Election results

2022

 
 
 
 
 
 
 
|-
| colspan="8" bgcolor="#E9E9E9"|
|-

2017

2012

References

3